Aquinnah Cultural Center (ACC) is a non-profit museum and education center, based in Aquinnah, Massachusetts, dedicated to preserving and promoting Aquinnah Wampanoag history, culture and contributions on Martha’s Vineyard.

History 
Aquinnah Cultural Center was founded in 1998. In 2006, the Edwin DeVries Vanderhoop Homestead, a historic homestead built in 1890 by a Wampanoag-Surinamese American Edwin DeVries Vanderhoop, was restored and reopened as the Aquinnah Cultural Center.  

The ACC is located near the Gay Head lighthouse. 

The Aquinnah Cultural Center is the home of the Aquinnah Wampanoag Museum.

Mission 
The Aquinnah Cultural Center's mission is to preserve, educated, and document the Aquinnah Wampanoag self-defined art, history, culture and contributions of the past, present and future.

References

External links 

 Aquinnah Cultural Center website

Martha's Vineyard
Wampanoag Tribe of Gay Head
Tourist attractions in Aquinnah, Massachusetts
Native American museums in Massachusetts
Historic house museums in Massachusetts
Museums in Dukes County, Massachusetts
Aquinnah, Massachusetts